Guney-ye Sharqi Rural District (Doğu Güney Rural District) is in the Central District of Shabestar County, East Azerbaijan province, Iran. At the National Census of 2006, its population was 5,276 in 1,596 households. There were 6,357 inhabitants in 1,947 households at the following census of 2011. At the most recent census of 2016, the population of the rural district was 5,579 in 1,936 households. The largest of its six villages was Dizaj Khalil, with 3,137 people.

References 

Shabestar County

Rural Districts of East Azerbaijan Province

Populated places in East Azerbaijan Province

Populated places in Shabestar County